Gunnar Landtman (6 May 1878, Helsinki – 30 October 1940, Helsinki) was a Finnish philosopher as well as a sociology and philosophy professor. A pupil of Edvard Westermarck, he graduated from the University of Helsinki in 1905. He later became an associate professor there from 1910 to 1927 and then a temporary professor until his death in 1940. At the university, Landtman was a member of the Prometheus Society, a student society promoting freedom of religion. Landtman was the first modern sociological anthropologist. His most important journey was a two-year trip to Papua New Guinea where he lived with the Kiwai Papuans from 1910 to 1912. He was from 1922 to 1924 a member of the Parliament of Finland, where he represented the Swedish People's Party of Finland (SFP).

Bibliography
 The Origin of Priesthood (1905)
 The Primary Causes of Social Inequality (1909)
Wanderings of the Dead in the Folk-Lore of the Kiwai-speaking Papuans (1912)
The Poetry of the Kiwai Papuans (1913)
The folk-tales of the Kiwai Papuans (1917)
The Pidgin English of British New Guinea (1918)
Papuan Magic in the Building of Houses (1920)
The Kiwai Papuans of British New Guinea: A Nature-born Instance of Rousseau's Ideal Community (1927)
A Descriptive Survey of the Material Culture of the Kiwai People (1937)
 The Origin of the Inequality of the Social Classes (1938)

Sources 

https://web.archive.org/web/20110604125833/http://www2.hs.fi/english/archive/news.asp?id=20010410IE5
 Gunnar Landtman in Papua: 1910 to 1912.

1878 births
1940 deaths
People from Uusimaa Province (Grand Duchy of Finland)
Swedish-speaking Finns
Swedish People's Party of Finland politicians
Members of the Parliament of Finland (1922–24)
Finnish philosophers
Finnish sociologists
Finnish anthropologists
University of Helsinki alumni
Academic staff of the University of Helsinki